The Interpretation (Amendment) Act 1993 was an Interpretation Act passed by the Oireachtas in order to promote gender-inclusive language. It supplemented the Interpretation Act 1937 by providing that (as well as the pre-existing rule that the masculine includes feminine) the feminine gender would also be taken to include the masculine.

The Act was repealed and re-enacted by the Interpretation Act 2005. Section 18(b)(ii) of that Act provides, "In an Act passed on or after 22 December 1993, and in a statutory instrument made after that date, a word importing the feminine gender shall be read as also importing the masculine gender".

References

1993 in Irish law
Acts of the Oireachtas of the 1990s